This is a list of soccer transfers for the 2016 North American Soccer League season.

This list includes all transfers made after clubs played their last match of the 2015 NASL season and before they played their last match of the 2016 NASL season.

Transfers
All clubs without a flag are members of the North American Soccer League.

References

Specific

2016
Transfers
North American Soccer League
North American Soccer League